The Oklahoma Educational Television Authority (OETA) is a state network of PBS member television stations serving the U.S. state of Oklahoma. The authority operates as a statutory corporation that holds the licenses for all of the PBS stations operating in the state; it is managed by an independent board of gubernatorial appointees, and university and education officials, which is linked to the executive branch of the Oklahoma state government through the Secretary of Education.

In addition to offering television programs supplied by the Public Broadcasting Service (PBS) and acquired from various independent distributors, the network produces news, public affairs, cultural, and documentary programming; the OETA also distributes online education programs for classroom use and teacher professional development, and maintains the state's Warning, Alert and Response Network (WARN) infrastructure to disseminate emergency alerts to Oklahoma residents. The broadcast signals of the four full-power and fifteen translator stations comprising the network cover almost all of the state, as well as fringe areas of Kansas, Missouri, Arkansas, and Texas near the Oklahoma state line. It and KRSU-TV, an independent public station owned by Rogers State University in Claremore, are Oklahoma's only public television stations.

The OETA network's main offices, production facilities, and Oklahoma City transmitter are located at the intersection of Kelley Avenue and Britton Road in northeastern Oklahoma City, adjacent to the studios of KWTV-DT and KSBI. In Tulsa, OETA uses studios on the campus of Oklahoma State University's extension center.

History

Incorporation and development
The OETA network traces its history to November 19, 1951, when a state educational television development conference was held to direct the Oklahoma State Regents for Higher Education to file applications with the Federal Communications Commission (FCC) to reserve certain broadcast television frequencies in selected cities throughout Oklahoma for non-commercial educational stations. In a unanimous vote, the Oklahoma Legislature subsequently approved House Concurrent Resolution #5, which urged the FCC to reserve broadcast television frequencies for non-commercial use. On May 18, 1953, Oklahoma became the first state that passed legislation to develop a statewide educational television service, when the legislature passed House Bill #1033, creating the Oklahoma Educational Television Authority as an independent statutory corporation. The bill—which was co-sponsored by State Rep. W. H. Langley (D-Stilwell) and State Sen. J. Byron Dacus (D-Gotebo), and was signed by Governor Johnston Murray—charged the organization with providing educational television programming to Oklahomans on a coordinated statewide basis, to be made possible with cooperation from the state's educational, government and cultural agencies, under the supervision and direction of the statute authority.

After appointing its members, in August 1953, the OETA Board of Directors held its first meeting and began the process of forming a statewide public television network. On December 2, 1953, the FCC granted a construction permit to build a television station on VHF channel 13 in Oklahoma City; seven months later, on July 21, 1954, it would grant OETA a second permit to build a non-commercial station on VHF channel 11 in Tulsa. To help finance the venture, the OETA was authorized to issue revenue bonds redeemable with financial funding accumulated in the public building fund. It would take three years for OETA to sign on its first station, as the legislature failed to appropriate operational funding to the statute corporation, which it was required to allocate under mandate of the authority charter; legislators believed that donations from private entities and the public would be able to cover the operating expenses for the upstart stations.

After securing a broadcast license from the FCC, $540,000 in legislative appropriations, and private funding from various special interest groups (led by a $150,000 donation by Daily Oklahoman publisher Edward K. Gaylord and the donation of $13,000 worth of broadcasting equipment from RCA), KETA (which added the TV to its callsign on January 31, 1983) in Oklahoma City—which would become the network's flagship—was finally able to sign on the air over channel 13 on April 13, 1956; it was the first educational television station to sign on in Oklahoma, the second in the Southwestern United States (after KUHT in Houston, which launched in May 1953 as the nation's first public television station) and the 20th non-commercial television station to sign on within the United States. Channel 13 originally operated from studio facilities located on the campus of the University of Oklahoma in Norman; its transmitter antenna (which began construction on August 1, 1955) was based in northeast Oklahoma City near the intersection of Wilshire Boulevard and Kelley Avenue, per an agreement with the Oklahoma Television Corporation that granted the OETA free use of the  transmission tower and adjacent land near the studio building of KWTV (channel 9). (The tower was decommissioned when KETA and KWTV switched to digital-only broadcasts from a separate tower, located between 122nd Street and the John Kilpatrick Turnpike in northeast Oklahoma City, in 2009; the antenna and the upper half of the tower were physically disassembled by engineers and crane equipment during the summer of 2014, and its remnant sections were imploded that October.)

KETA—as well as the full-power repeaters it would sign on in later years—originally served as a member station of the National Educational Television and Radio Center (NETRC), which evolved into National Educational Television (NET) in 1963. During its first fourteen years of operation, KETA – and later, KOED – maintained a 20-hour weekly schedule of instruction programming, broadcasting only on Monday through Friday afternoons (from 1:30 to 4:00 p.m.) from August through May; much of the station's programming in its early years consisted of video telecourse lectures televised in cooperation with the Oklahoma State Department of Education, which offered course subjects attributable for college credit. Programming from NET aired on KETA year-round during prime time for 2½ hours each Monday through Friday (from 6:30 to 9:00 p.m.).

In June 1956, ABC elected to use KETA to telecast the network's coverage of the 1956 Republican and Democratic National Conventions, and Presidential election results. In seeking a waiver of FCC rules requiring advertisements to be deleted when an educational television outlet carries a sponsored program, ABC noted that it was denied "effective competitive access" in Oklahoma City, due to the fact that KWTV and NBC affiliate WKY-TV (channel 4, later KTVY and now KFOR-TV) were the only stations operating in the market at that time and already had primary network allegiances. (ABC's original full-time Oklahoma City affiliate, KTVQ [channel 25, allocation now occupied by Fox affiliate KOKH-TV], had ceased operations during bankruptcy proceedings in December 1955; its Enid affiliate, KGEO-TV [channel 5, now KOCO-TV], however, had begun a transition into an Oklahoma City-based outlet that would take eight years to complete.) By early July, the OETA had withdrawn KETA from the waiver petition, resulting in the FCC choosing unanimously to refuse to "entertain" an ABC-only request to waive the rules.

Expansion into a statewide network
Over the course of nineteen years, the authority gradually evolved into a statewide public television network. KOED-TV (channel 11) in Tulsa, which was founded through a legislative appropriation granted to the authority, became the first of KETA's three satellite stations to go on the air, on January 12, 1959. The launch of the state's second educational television station made Oklahoma only the second U.S. state to have an operational educational television network (after Alabama Educational Television, now Alabama Public Television, which began its expansion into a statewide network with the April 1955 sign-on of its second television station, WBIQ in Birmingham). (The authority petitioned to move KOED's allocation to that reserved by local commercial station KJRH-TV [channel 2] in July 1981, but was ultimately denied permission to take over the frequency.) In 1970, KETA and KOED became member stations of the Public Broadcasting Service (PBS), which was launched as an independent entity to supersede and assume many of the functions of the predecessor NET network.

OETA experienced significant growth under the stewardship of Bob Allen, a former Director of Communications at the Oklahoma State Department of Education, who was appointed as the authority's executive director in June 1972 and remained in that position until his retirement in December 1998. Allen—who would also serve on the Board of Directors of PBS and other national public television organizations during his tenure at the member network—initiated many efforts to help grow OETA into his vision as a network that would distribute educational and cultural programs throughout Oklahoma's 77 counties.) and Bill Thrash, who was appointed as OETA's station manager and program director after having worked at KTVY's programming and managerial departments since the 1970s, In 1973, OETA expanded its broadcast schedule to 49 hours per week (from 9:00 a.m. to 3:00 p.m. and 6:00 to 10:00 p.m. each weekday); that year, the network expanded its weekday lineup into the late-evening hours, and began to offer an expanded programming schedule on Saturdays (from 3:00 to 10:00 p.m.), in addition to an existing Sunday lineup that expanded from evenings only to the daytime hours around that time. OETA moved its main Oklahoma City operations in 1974, when it opened a new studio and office facility next to KETA's Kelley Avenue transmitter site, which was constructed through funds appropriated by the legislature and allowed the member network to begin producing locally originated programming. To accrue additional donations to fund programming and operational expenditures, OETA inaugurated its annual "Festival" pledge drive in 1975; the first edition of the two-week event—which is held each March, except in 2019, during the suspension of pledge collections in the midst of its dispute with the OETA Foundation—saw OETA raise more than $125,000 in public and private donations to help with programming dues and acquisitions. In 1976, OETA purchased a mobile broadcasting unit for the production of programs in the field, which allowed it to conduct remote broadcasts at various locations throughout Oklahoma. The following year, the state legislature's OETA appropriation funding for 1977, granted the authority funds to purchase an extensive curriculum of instructional telecourse programs for broadcast on the network to schools across Oklahoma.

On December 1, 1977, the network launched its third station, KOET (channel 3) in Eufaula, as a satellite of KOED-TV to serve most of east-central Oklahoma. (Its signal overlaps with that of KOED in that section of the state near and to the adjacent north of the Interstate 40 corridor [including portions of McIntosh County, to the north of Eufaula], and with KETA in portions of Creek, Okfuskee, and Hughes counties near State Highway 56.) The sign-on of KOET—which the FCC had reserved its would-be channel 3 allocation for noncommercial use on August 20, 1975, and granted it to petitioner OETA on December 28, 1976—was made possible in part by a 1966 federal grant to the authority that was intended to fund the expansion of the state network and to allow it to purchase color broadcasting equipment. In 1978, OETA produced the first program to be syndicated nationally by the member network to other public television stations, when it broadcast the U.S. Open Table Tennis Championships; that year also saw the premiere of OETA's first regionally syndicated series, The Other School System, a 13-part program co-hosted by Art Linkletter and former Miss America (and Clinton native) Jane Jayroe.

OETA launched its fourth and final full-power station on August 6, 1978, when KWET (channel 12) in Cheyenne signed on as a satellite of KETA, serving west-central and portions of northwestern and southwestern Oklahoma, and the far eastern Texas Panhandle. (OETA filed a petition to reserve channel 12 for non-commercial use on February 18, 1976, and granted it to the authority on May 13 of that year.) OETA also began building a network of low-power UHF translators (each operating at 1,000 watts) to service parts of the state that were unable to receive the four full-power VHF stations. That same year, the network signed on its first two repeaters—K15AA in Hugo and K63BA (now K23HY-D) in Idabel—to relay KOET's programming into southeastern Oklahoma.

In 1979, under the guidance of Governor George Nigh, OETA activated four additional translators—K56AY (now K34IN-D) in Beaver, K55BV (now K20IT-D) in Boise City, K58AX (now K28NU-D) in Buffalo and K16AB-D in Guymon—to relay KWET and KETA's programming to the Oklahoma Panhandle and portions of northwestern Oklahoma. By the time the translator network was completed in 1981, with the sign-on of six repeaters in northwestern, north-central, and south-central Oklahoma—K30AE in Alva, K28AC (now K36KE-D) in Ardmore, K54BB (now K47KI-D) in Duncan, K56BQ (now K34IM-D) in Frederick, K36AB in Lawton and K28NV in Ponca City,—OETA extended its coverage to nearly the entire state, with fringe coverage from select translators into portions of Kansas, Missouri, Arkansas and Texas. (OETA's full-power stations make up the vast majority of its overall coverage, reaching roughly 80% of Oklahoma's geographic population.) In 1981, OETA opened a satellite facility in east Tulsa on North Sheridan Road and East Independence Street (southwest of Tulsa International Airport) to serve as a secondary production facility and to house the operations of KOED and its relays; the first television program to be produced out of the new Tulsa facility, Arts Chronicle, made its debut on the network the following year. 1981 also saw OETA enter into an agreement to syndicate Creative Crafts, an arts and crafts program that had been produced by KTVY in Oklahoma City since 1950, on the network's stations on a 13-week trial basis.

Over-the-air service to KETA and its translators in north-central and southern Oklahoma was restored later that week, after KWTV allowed its fellow tower tenant to use their backup cable until repairs could be conducted. However, to facilitate upgrades to its transmission system that would begin on August 15, KWTV management notified Governor Nigh that it needed to use the cable to replace clamps attached to channel 9's main cable line, a situation that would have resulted in OETA having to suspend programming for two weeks. After the Oklahoma State Contingency Review Board rejected the authority's request for emergency funds for the transmission cable replacement, on July 21, Allen initiated his own fundraising effort: it included distributing funding solicitation mailers that were delivered to 34,000 private and public donors who contributed to the "Festival '83" pledge drive that March (who were asked to contribute pledges averaging $6.40 per person), and a stunt conducted by Allen himself, in which he climbed onto the tower to seek donations from the public. The effort raised $248,000 in donations ($40,000 above his funding goal of $218,000). The failure to obtain legislature approval to be granted funding for the repairs came as OETA received a 24.8% reduction in state funding in its 1983 funding appropriation, stemming from a decline in state revenue that necessitated budget cuts that adversely affected several other state agencies; the cuts led to OETA implementing a two-day furlough of its entire employee base that December. Also that year, the authority established the OETA Foundation, becoming one of the first public television stations in the nation to adopt an endowment model for private donations; the foundation's programming endowment plan was created to solicit and receive permanent endowment donations to help support Oklahoma's public television system.

To help improve OETA's standing in the state, Allen initiated several ambitious programming efforts. In 1987, the authority's production unit, The Oklahoma Network, acquired the national syndication rights to The Lawrence Welk Show, producing compilation episodes combining excerpts from the classic variety series with original hosted wraparound segments; OETA subsequently began distributing the program to other PBS member stations throughout the United States. Then in 1989, the network premiered Oklahoma Passage, a five-part miniseries told in the form of a first-person story illustrating the first 150 years of Oklahoma's history from the perspective of a Georgia family who moved to the Indian Territory in the 1840s. In 1990, OETA premiered Wordscape, a 16-part nationally syndicated instructional series for children in Grades 4 through 6, providing grammar instruction through two to five word cells per 15-minute episode, which were tied to a common theme; the Heartland Chapter of the National Academy of Television Arts and Sciences awarded the program a 1991 Heartland Emmy Award for Outstanding Youth/Children's Program.

Acquisition of a second station in Oklahoma City ("The Literacy Channel")
The OETA corporation was involved in a 1987 proposal by Visalia, California-based Pappas Telecasting Companies, under which Heritage Media would have donated the license of its Oklahoma City-based Fox affiliate, KAUT (channel 43, now an independent station owned by Nexstar Media Group), to OETA for $1 million. In exchange, Pappas would acquire the programming inventories of both KAUT and rival independent KGMC (channel 34, now CW affiliate KOCB), including the rights to channel 43's Fox affiliation (which Pappas planned to transfer to channel 25), and enter into a 25-year lease to allow OETA to operate the KAUT transmitter facility for $1 per year; KGMC (then owned by Seraphim Media; as KOCB, it is now owned by Sinclair Broadcast Group) was to have become a Home Shopping Network affiliate and acquire some religious programs to fill certain ancillary timeslots. OETA planned to help fund the conversion of channel 43 into an educational station through start-up grants, including a $75,000 grant awarded by management from KOCO-TV. A later revision to the plan saw OETA file an application with the FCC to purchase KGMC as a contingency measure. OETA's involvement in the earlier plans received disapproval from then-Governor Henry Bellmon, who noted that authority management had earlier claimed it did not have enough funding to adequately operate its existing stations. The state legislature's OETA funding appropriation bill for FY1990 prohibited the authority from using state funds towards expenses for the proposed second educational station, and from proposing the appropriation of additional state funding to finance the acquisition and programming conversion if sufficient private funding was not obtained. Complicating matters further, Governor Bellmon called for a state audit of the OETA statute corporation to address allegations from a former employee that the member network's management had misused public funds, and that station employees were required to attend foundation-related meetings and worked for the foundation's pledge drive on state and additional uncompensated time. Although the transaction would receive FCC approval, the Pappas deal was terminated in February 1989 after the company missed its deadline to finalize the KOKH purchase; the three stations continued on as rival commercial stations until the 1991 license donation.

On April 23, 1991, Heritage announced that it would donate the license, transmitter facilities and master control equipment of KAUT to OETA, in an agreement—under which the donation of the license and equipment was contingent on Heritage completing its purchase of independent station KOKH-TV from Busse Broadcast Communications—that included a two-year option for the authority to purchase KAUT's remaining assets for $1.5 million. This set forth a new ownership and programming transfer plan that borrowed elements from the failed Pappas Telecasting deal. On August 15, 1991, OETA converted channel 43 into a PBS member station, serving as a secondary outlet to KETA-TV; KOKH received from channel 43 the local rights to the Fox affiliation and some of KAUT's syndicated programming inventory, 30 former KAUT employees (including then-general manager Harlan Reams), and other equipment and intellectual property that belonged to KAUT. Five months later, on January 17, 1992, the OETA changed channel 43's callsign to KTLC in reflection of the on-air branding it adopted upon the switch to PBS, "The Literacy Channel," which intended to identify its commitment to telecourse programming (which, dating to the Pappas proposal, OETA had intended to increase by 250% through the conversion, with the bulk—making up 22 hours of the station's weekly schedule—being carried by channel 43). The development of "The Literacy Channel" was part of a broadcasting pilot initiative between OETA's Board of Directors, the OETA Foundation Board of Trustees, and Heritage Media; Sandy Welch, PBS' senior vice president for education services at that time, and management with the Children's Television Workshop collaborated with the consortium in the development of the format, which OETA and PBS intended to use as a model for instructional and educational programming on a national level. OETA solicited $300,000 in private funds for programming acquisitions for the station's conversion into an educational outlet; studio, transmitter and other operational acquisitions would require additional funding appropriated by the Oklahoma Legislature, which expressed limited objection to OETA's acquisition of channel 43 this time around.

As a PBS station, KTLC aired same-day broadcasts of programs it shared with the main OETA network, along with some programs acquired from American Public Television and other syndicators for exclusive local broadcast on channel 43. The schedule included fitness programs on weekday mornings, instructional programs and select PBS series from late evening until sign-off, and a broad mix of adult education programs on Saturday and Sunday early afternoons and late evenings; children's programs made up the majority of the schedule, airing from mid-morning to early evening (a situation atypical of most PBS stations, which typically air children's shows exclusively during the daytime hours). KTLC broadcast daily from 6:00 a.m. to midnight in its early years under OETA ownership; however, funding shortfalls resulted in fluctuations to the station's broadcasting hours on weekdays and weekends starting in July 1993, eventually settling on its original weekday broadcast schedule and a truncated seven-hour schedule on Saturdays and Sundays (from 5:00 p.m. to midnight) by January 1995. (The abbreviated scheduling resulted in many cable providers throughout the Oklahoma City market re-designating their assigned channel slot for KTLC as a timeshare feed to carry mid-to-lower-priority basic cable networks when the station was off-air; for example, Cox Cable's Oklahoma City system carried QVC on channel 13—which experienced co-channel interference with KETA's analog broadcast signal—during KTLC's off-hours from January 1992 until June 1998.)

The difficulties that OETA had operating and funding the two Oklahoma City stations led to the authority making the decision to sell channel 43 in the fall of 1997. On January 8, 1998, Viacom subsidiary Paramount Stations Group (since folded into what is now CBS News and Stations, itself owned by the original Viacom's successor, Paramount Global) purchased KTLC for $23.5 million, the proceeds from which OETA earmarked to establish the Legacy for Excellence Trust Funds, a pool of endowment funds which, among other projects, went toward funding the construction of the network's digital broadcast transmitters. Paramount's purchase of the station was necessitated by the displacement of the United Paramount Network (UPN) from KOCB on January 18, 1998 (which, as a consequence of a July 1997 affiliation agreement between The WB and KOCB owner Sinclair involving the group's UPN-affiliated and independent stations, made UPN's programming unviewable within the Oklahoma City market for six months). Paramount converted channel 43 into general entertainment-formatted, UPN owned-and-operated station KPSG on June 19 of that year (the affiliation switch was originally set to occur on June 1, though technical issues and delays in finalizing the sale twice postponed the date of the changeover). Under a five-year conditional clause included in the sale agreement between OETA and Paramount, KPSG was required to allow OETA to lease portions of its airtime after the station joined UPN, primarily to simulcast blocks of OETA's "Festival" and "AugustFest" programming for eight hours each weekend during the duration of the March and August pledge drives, continue airing PBS educational shows supplied by the member network each weekday from 7:00 a.m. to 12:00 p.m. (Channel 43 would drop all OETA-provided children's programming from its schedule in September of that year, and stopped carrying other ancillary PBS programming by the Fall of 2001.)

Recent history
In April 2000, OETA began installation of a digital satellite distribution network to replace its microwave distribution system, in an effort to modernize transmission relays to the 19 full-power and translator stations; the satellite feed was first uplinked to the authority's translators in the Oklahoma Panhandle, with the remaining stations being brought online into that summer. In 2003, the four full-power OETA member stations each began to operate digital television signals; the launch of the signals came just before an FCC-imposed May 31 deadline for public television stations to commence digital transmissions, after delays by the state legislature in allocating funding for the upgrades until the 2001 legislative session, when it appropriated $5.6 million for OETA to install its digital transmission equipment (the OETA Foundation matched the appropriation with $5.6 million in private donations to fund the digital transition; funding for the network's digital transition would total at $11.5 million). In 2005, OETA began broadcasting some PBS programs across its stations' digital signals in high definition. In 2006, the authority launched three full-time digital channels as a subcarrier feeds: OETA OKLA (which was devoted to local and regional programs, both recent and archived, along with carrying select PBS-supplied programming content; it was converted into an affiliate of the World Channel in January 2019), OETA Kids (offering PBS-supplied and acquired children's programs; it was originally programmed by OETA directly, before affiliating with the PBS Kids Channel in January 2017) and OETA You (a member service of the PBS YOU instructional programming network, which became an affiliate of its successor service Create in January 2007). In December 2008, OETA began producing most of its locally produced productions in high definition; however, unlike the commercial television stations serving the state's four main television markets, most programming promotions supplied by PBS or short-form content produced internally or via outside providers aired during breaks between programs were not transmitted by the member network in HD until late 2018 (although underwriter sponsorship tags and select promos for OETA original programs were presented in the format).

As early as 2000, OETA developed plans to construct a new Tulsa facility to replace its existing Sheridan Road building, which suffered from infrastructure problems, space limitations, and technical issues with its aging broadcasting equipment (including equipment interference caused by airplanes arriving and departing from Tulsa International Airport). The authority obtained initial funding from several area legislative representatives, who pooled $250,000 in bond money diverted from the State Capitol improvement fund to go towards development of the new complex. OETA attempted to find a suitable facility when it decided to provide funding for the planned Thomas K. McKeon Center for Creativity at Tulsa Community College's South Boston Avenue campus, which was to include a television production facility funded independently of the college—to be named The Distance Learning Production and Broadcast Studio—connected or adjacent to the building to serve as its new Tulsa studio. The state legislature denied a proposal by the authority to appropriate funding to construct the studio building, resulting in OETA dropping out as a planned tenant at the Center for Creativity shortly before design renderings were submitted. On August 20, 2009, OETA announced that it would build an  studio facility on the campus of Oklahoma State University–Tulsa, with construction scheduled to begin in October of that year. OETA moved its Tulsa operations into the new Greenwood Avenue facility in March 2011.

In recent years, OETA's annual appropriation budget has been incrementally reduced by the Oklahoma Legislature, declining by 45% between July 2008 and June 2016 (total operating expenses decreased from just over $5 million in 2006 to $2.8 million for the 2017 fiscal year). State funding accounts for about one-third of OETA's annual operating budget, with the remainder of the member network's funding coming from membership donations, in-kind contributions and private donations to the OETA Foundation. The cuts in state funding have led to the cancellation of some of the member network's news and documentary programs such as Oklahoma Forum (a public affairs program that featured topics related to the Oklahoma state legislature) and Stateline (which dealt with issues important to Oklahoma as well as the United States as a whole), while OETA also laid off news staff at its State Capitol bureau. OETA has also operated with a reduced staff, leaving several vacant job positions unfilled for extended periods due to hiring freezes imposed by the authority; according to the Oklahoma Gazette, in 2010, OETA employed 68 staff members (well under the 84 employees it was authorized to maintain in on-air and administrative positions). In a June 2016 interview with the Tulsa World, executive director Dan Schiedel said that the OETA Foundation's private contributions from viewers and corporate donors have not been able to keep up with the reduction in state appropriations to the authority. The funding cuts have led to disagreements among state legislators. Some lawmakers have argued that OETA is no longer a "core government function" and should be eliminated as a government agency if it cannot be self-supported and that public television has been outmoded by an expanding array of cable and digital content that provide similar programming; lawmakers serving the state's rural communities, however, have opposed the cuts on the basis that the OETA network is one of the few programming options available for residents who do not subscribe to a cable or internet service provider.

Dispute with the OETA Foundation 
On December 6, 2018, the OETA Foundation filed a declaratory judgment petition with the U.S. District Court of Oklahoma County against the OETA, alleging that the agency was trying to "obtain complete and unfettered control" over the foundation's assets through a new proposed memorandum of understanding (MOU) that would set new rules governing its relationship with the OETA Foundation not covered by an existing 1992 agreement to protect monetary gifts from private donors and underwriters and to comply with state regulator requirements, including classifying the foundation as a "component unit of OETA" and a revokable restriction on its use of OETA service marks or logos. The petition claimed that OETA refused to report on expenditures when requesting disbursements of its Corporation for Public Broadcasting Community Service Grant funding (received by the foundation on behalf of OETA), had accused the foundation of appropriating donations for the development of the cultural program Mosaic, Oklahoma without OETA authorization, and had caused a 30% decline in foundation donations over the same period in 2017 by airing national fundraising programs from PBS and other distributors instead of the locally originated AugustFest pledge drive—which, like OETA's other twice-yearly pledge drives, featured a mix of special programs and live segments—in 2018. (OETA also suspended its 2019 Festival drive for similar reasons; the member network resumed pledge drives in November 2019, using the aforementioned national interstitial format and switching their scheduling from biannually to quarterly.)

Foundation representatives contended that OETA management believes that the foundation's oversight demands over budget issues had exceeded its authority, and that the Kirkpatrick Foundation and other unnamed private donors objected to provisions in the new MOU that would have given OETA greater operational control over the OETA Foundation and led the former to withdraw their support in July 2018 amid concern that the loss of the foundation's 501(c)(3) status would make their donations no longer be tax deductible. (Kirkpatrick executive director Louisa McCune mentioning in a letter to the foundation that it provides monetary gifts only to nonprofit organizations and not government entities.) In a statement OETA representatives also detailed other issues it says had arisen with the foundation in the years since Daphne Dowdy was appointed as its president in 2014, including the withholding of funds and refusal to release financial documents to the agency for joint audits with the Oklahoma state government. (The OETA board later stated that the foundation had undertaken a disinformation campaign "aimed at undermining OETA in the hearts and minds of donors, citizens and public officials.")

On December 14, 2018, OETA informed the OETA Foundation that it must vacate the network's Oklahoma City headquarters by January 13, 2019; in its reasoning for the eviction, OETA Board of Directors chairman Garrett King stated that the OETA Foundation had interfered with day-to-day operations by changing locks, attempting other building alterations and denied OETA personnel access to sections of the member network's main facility, along with having foundation staff make repeated attempts to hack into OETA's computer system. (The foundation defied the eviction notice, continuing to operate from the facility after the proposed deadline had passed; Dowdy cited the organization's lack of a lease or rental agreement with OETA for the facility as to why it chose not to vacate its offices.) Subsequently, on December 21, OETA asked the District Court for a summary judgement allowing it to terminate its current agreement with the OETA Foundation and be able to select and immediately transfer assets to another nonprofit organization if one was chosen to serve as its fundraising partner.

On January 8, 2019, the nine-member OETA Board of Directors voted unanimously to sever ties with the OETA Foundation and transfer all fundraising efforts to a new organization, Friends of OETA Inc., while also adopting and ratifying an attorney-client contract approved by the office of then-Oklahoma Attorney General Mike Hunter shortly after Friends of OETA was incorporated on November 30, 2018. OETA temporarily stopped accepting donations until a relationship between the agency and Friends of OETA was negotiated and formally ratified. Dowdy stated that the original foundation—which was required to relinquish all held assets, funds, information and property being held under the resolution—would continue fundraising and providing financial support for OETA as the action did not dissolve the OETA Foundation. The foundation also charged that Friends of OETA's management by OETA board members (with King as its president and Oklahoma State Regents for Higher Education Chancellor Glen Johnson acting as its secretary) created conflicts of interest that would result in the organization having a "complete absence of financial and ethical accountability." (The new organization would otherwise be run by an independent governing board to which the authority would elect and whose members it would be able to remove.)

On April 10, 2019, the Oklahoma Educational Television Authority reached a "mutually acceptable" settlement agreement with the OETA Foundation, in which the foundation would dissolve and transfer "all funds and assets held in trust for OETA" (totaling $1.6 million) to Friends of OETA by 12:00 p.m. on April 12. As part of the agreement, Daphne Dowdy—whose role as OETA Foundation president was immediately terminated—would receive her remaining salary for 2019 as part of a severance agreement and was required to vacate her office at OETA's Oklahoma City headquarters by May 15, and all 16 OETA Foundation staffers (except for Dowdy) would be permitted to choose between receiving severance pay or seeking employment with either OETA or Friends of OETA. The OETA Board of Directors seated the Friends of OETA governing board during a regularly scheduled meeting at its Oklahoma City offices on April 24.

Stations

Full-power stations

Notes:
1. KETA-TV used the callsign KOED during is construction permit from 1953 to 1954, and KETA (without the -TV suffix) until January 31, 1983.
2. KOET and KWET used the -TV suffix in their callsigns from January 31, 1983, to September 23, 1998.

Aside from their transmitters, the OETA stations—with the exception of KETA-TV—do not maintain any physical presence in their cities of license.

Translators
In addition to its four full-power satellites, OETA operates a network of low-power translators that cover the Oklahoma Panhandle, and areas of northwestern, north-central and southern Oklahoma that receive limited to no over-the-air reception from the full-power outlets based in Oklahoma City, Cheyenne and Eufaula:

Current

Decommissioned

Several of OETA's translator stations—specifically, those covering the Oklahoma Panhandle, northern and southern Oklahoma—produce Grade B signal coverage that extends into portions of extreme southern Kansas, the northern and eastern Texas Panhandle and extreme north Texas; KOET's full-power signal produces fringe coverage that extends into areas of western Arkansas that are also covered by Fayetteville-based Arkansas PBS satellite KAFT, while the signal of KOED extends into portions of southeastern Kansas and far southwestern Missouri served by KOZJ in Joplin (the westernmost station of the two-station Ozarks Public Television mini-network). OETA does not operate any translators in northeastern Oklahoma, as that area of the state receives adequate over-the-air coverage from KOED and KOET as well as fringe coverage of PBS member stations in Missouri and Arkansas.

Some of the viewer donations to Friends of OETA and its predecessor OETA Foundation—especially those collected through OETA's winter and summer pledge drives—come from these neighboring states, which are served primarily by locally based PBS member stations and regional networks covering the aforementioned regions that also have partial overlap with the over-the-air signals of OETA satellites and translators, including KPTS/Wichita, Kansas, KACV-TV/Amarillo, Texas, Arkansas PBS, Ozarks Public Television, and Smoky Hills PBS.

Cable and satellite availability
OETA is available on all cable television providers within the state of Oklahoma, including Cox Communications (which serves the Oklahoma City and Tulsa metropolitan areas), Suddenlink Communications (which covers portions of western Oklahoma), Fidelity Communications (which serves the Lawton area), and Sparklight (which serves portions of southern Oklahoma within the Ada–Sherman market). Additionally, KOET is carried on channel 9 over Cox Communications' Fort Smith, Arkansas, system as a secondary PBS outlet for the area, alongside Arkansas PBS satellite station KAFT. (KOET's city of license, Eufaula, lies within the Tulsa market, though portions of its viewing area to the east of the city—including the counties of Sequoyah and Le Flore—lie within the Fort Smith market.) On satellite, KETA, KOED and KOET are carried by DirecTV and Dish Network on the local Oklahoma City, Tulsa and Fort Smith feeds, respectively, of the two satellite providers.

From October 1, 1996, until OETA began carrying the feed over-the-air in April 2006, some cable providers within the Oklahoma City and Tulsa markets (principally, Cox's Oklahoma City system, Multimedia Cablevision's suburban Oklahoma City systems and Tele-Communications Inc. [TCI]'s Tulsa system, the latter two of which were absorbed into Cox in early 2000) carried the PBS Satellite Service over KETA and KOED's assigned channel slots from 12:00 to 6:00 a.m. Sunday through Thursdays and from 1:00 to 6:00 a.m. Fridays and Saturdays, while their broadcast signals were silent. (Until its over-the-air stations adopted such a schedule in April 2006, the OETA state network was one of the few remaining broadcast television outlets in the United States that had not converted to a 24-hour-a-day schedule.) Beforehand, many cable providers around the state, including Cox, Multimedia and TCI, carried other lower-priority cable networks that limited headend frequency space precluded from assigning them to a separate full-time channel over OETA's channel slots (such as filler) during overnight/early morning time periods during the broadcast signals' off-air periods.

Digital television

Digital channels
The digital signals of OETA's main full-power and low-power translator stations are multiplexed, with each station carrying four specialized digital subchannels with their own distinct programming:

 From its launch until the restoration of OETA Kids as an over-the-air service on November 13, 2013, and from January 1, 2017, until January 6, 2019, OETA World (as OETA Okla) also carried a block of PBS- and APT-sourced children's programs on Saturdays and Sundays to fulfill Children's Television Act programming guidelines for digital subchannels (originally airing in the morning and afternoon until 2010, before being scaled back to 5:00 a.m. to 12:00 p.m.; since the block's resumption, OETA Okla carried these programs from 7:00 to 11:00 a.m.). Beginning in 2009, OETA Okla gradually expanded the amount of PBS and American Public Television programming within its schedule, offering other replayed content from OETA's main schedule outside of the channel's regularly scheduled repeat block, as well as programs that OETA has no room to carry on its main feed's schedule. Prior to January 1, 2017, when the service began airing these programs in a more randomized structure in the time periods mentioned in that section above, OETA Okla rebroadcast the main OETA channel's prime time lineup on a one-day delay, with some alterations to allow certain locally produced content to air in other timeslots, on Monday through Saturday evenings and, from September 2015 to December 2016, on Monday through Friday mornings. Unlike other subchannel services of its format operated by other PBS member networks, OETA Okla never broadcast coverage of state government meetings – in this case, those of the Oklahoma Legislature – while it was in session.
 OETA Create and OETA Kids originally launched in 2006 on the third and fourth digital subchannels of OETA's four full-power digital stations. OETA Kids was the only one of the two subchannel services to be carried 24 hours a day, as bandwidth limitations necessitated OETA HD – which originally operated as a dedicated HD channel supplemental to the main analog simulcast – to be allocated additional bandwidth reserved for the OETA analog simulcast and OETA OKLA while the service carried high-definition programming. In 2008, the two services began operating strictly as cable-only services, leaving OETA Okla as the member network's only over-the-air multicast service (in the Oklahoma City and Tulsa markets, OETA Kids and OETA Create were carried on Cox Communications' digital cable service though its base limited basic tier on which OETA's standard definition and high definition feeds are also available). OETA restored the two services to all four of its full-power stations on November 13, 2013, operating on the subchannel placements they previously held prior to 2008.
 From the service's launch until 2010, OETA Kids carried children's programs daily from 5:00 a.m. to 11:00 p.m., with news and interview programs filling the remainder of the schedule.
 OETA Kids does not reference its full-power member stations in its custom ID slide (which predates its reversion into an over-the-air service) – even after that service became available over-the-air in November 2013. OETA Create did not utilize a custom station identification slide until June 2017, which is shown during Create's afternoon and evening programming (during which time promotions from the Create network feed are replaced with program promos and interstitial content that is also seen on OETA and OETA Okla); although, unlike with OETA Okla, the ID slide does not reference the specific subchannel placement of the service on each of the four full-power stations. To comply with FCC station identification regulations, both subchannels provide required identification of the member network's four full-power stations (using the in-program ID graphic seen on OETA's main feed during PBS programs that run more than one hour in length) after the top of each hour during regular programming.

Analog-to-digital conversion
During 2009, in the lead-up to the digital television transition that would ultimately occur on June 12, OETA began shutting down the analog transmitters of its stations on a staggered basis. Listed below are the post-transition channel allocations for each analog transmitter and the dates on which each ceased operation:
 KETA-TV discontinued regular programming on its analog signal, over VHF channel 13, on February 17, 2009, the original target date in which full-power television stations in the United States were to transition from analog to digital broadcasts under federal mandate (which was later pushed back to June 12, 2009). The station's digital signal relocated from its pre-transition UHF channel 32 to VHF channel 13.
 KOED-TV shut down its analog signal, over VHF channel 11, on February 17, 2009. The station's digital signal relocated from its pre-transition UHF channel 38 to VHF channel 11.
 KWET shut down its analog signal, over VHF channel 12, on March 31, 2009. The station's digital signal remained on its pre-transition VHF channel 8. Through the use of PSIP, digital television receivers display the station's virtual channel as its former VHF analog channel 12.
 KOET shut down its analog signal, over VHF channel 3, on March 31, 2009. The station's digital signal remained on its pre-transition UHF channel 31. Through the use of PSIP, digital television receivers display the station's virtual channel as its former VHF analog channel 3.
 All of OETA's fifteen low-power translator stations shut down their analog signals and converted to digital-only transmissions on June 12, 2009, the rescheduled date for full-power stations to transition to digital-only broadcasts. With the exception of K18IZ-D in Grandfield, the virtual channels of the repeaters transmit on channels corresponding to their physical allocation (which, depending on the station, were either their pre-transition allocation or relocated due to their allocation falling within the upper band of UHF frequencies—channels 52 to 69—that the FCC decommissioned from broadcasting use following the transition).

Programming
As a PBS member station, much of the programming aired on OETA consists of educational and entertainment programming distributed by PBS to its member stations, including Nova, the PBS NewsHour, Frontline, Masterpiece, Antiques Roadshow and Nature, OETA also carries programs distributed by American Public Television and other sources to fill its schedule, alongside programs produced exclusively for the state network.

OETA's weekday lineup is dominated by children's programs (such as Arthur, Wild Kratts, Daniel Tiger's Neighborhood and Sesame Street) between 6:00 a.m. and 5:00 p.m., followed by a two-hour block of international news programs (consisting of BBC World News's World News America and Outside Source, and the PBS NewsHour) leading into prime time. Programs provided by PBS are primarily shown on most nights in prime time except for Thursdays and Saturdays, which instead feature OETA original programs and content from American Public Television (OETA documentaries and British drama series air on Thursdays, while Saturdays feature The Lawrence Welk Show, music or documentary specials and the OETA Movie Club). On Saturdays, OETA carries a broad mix of how-to programs during the morning and early afternoon hours, and encore presentations of PBS prime time shows in the mid-to-late afternoon. Encores of PBS prime time educational documentary shows also air on Sundays in the late morning, with the remainder of that day's schedule outside of prime time consisting of newsmagazines and some how-to and outdoor programs.

Since the discontinuance of its Sunday late-night comedy block in September 2015, "Britcoms" have had an increasingly reduced presence on OETA's schedule, culminating in the removal of conventional British comedies (then solely consisting of Last of the Summer Wine) entirely in January 2020. (in addition to those aired via PBS, scripted British programmes on OETA consist of regular weekly airings of Doc Martin, Midsomer Murders, Death in Paradise and Father Brown on both the main feed in varying regular timeslots and as part of OETA World's Sunday morning British encore block, as well as a rotating hour-long drama block preceding the overnight PBS national schedule Monday through Thursday.) Until such content was supplanted in 2010 by an expanded weekday schedule of PBS Kids programs, OETA offered a heavy schedule of instructional programming on weekday mornings and early afternoons (by 2005, programs attributable to secondary school and college coursework totaled about 17½ hours of the member network's daily schedule during the calendar week); instructional programs (of the how-to variety) now air mainly on OETA's Create subchannel.

Original productions
OETA is one of several PBS member stations or regional networks that distributes programming for syndication to other public television stations around the United States; these programs, along with shows produced for exclusive broadcast on the OETA network within Oklahoma, are produced by the network's production unit, OETA: The Oklahoma Network. It has distributed The Lawrence Welk Show since October 3, 1987, after that series left commercial syndication, and has also produced specials featuring excerpts from the program (beginning with the 1987 PBS special, Lawrence Welk, Television's Music Man). The acquisition and syndication of the program—consisting of an initial pickup of 52 episodes—came after a successful pledge donation assignment during the Festival '87 drive that March, in which viewers were inquired whether OETA should return Welk to television; reruns of Lawrence Welk—which have become a staple of the member network's weekend evening schedule—have since become OETA's most-watched program. OETA also distributes The Kalb Report, a monthly discussion program focusing on issues of ethics and responsibility in media that is hosted by Marvin Kalb.

Locally produced programming on the state network includes the OETA Movie Club (a weekend evening showcase of American Public Television-packaged classic movies from the 1930s to the 1990s, which was originally hosted by B.J. Wexler from its premiere in February 1988 until November 2018. Wexler would introduce each show by serving himself a large bucket of popcorn and providing details of the movie and actors. The show is currently hosted by former Oklahoma News Report anchor Robert Burch), Oklahoma Horizon (a weekly newsmagazine, produced by the Oklahoma Department of Career and Technology Education in cooperation with the Oklahoma Department of Agriculture, Food, and Forestry, which focuses on economic and social issues, and is syndicated to the RFD-TV cable network in the United States and the Global Broadcasting Network in Europe), Oklahoma Gardening (a weekly gardening series produced by the Oklahoma Cooperative Extension Service at Oklahoma State University–Stillwater through the Department of Horticulture and Landscape Architecture and OSU Agricultural Communications Services, which debuted in 1975) and Gallery (which debuted in April 2001 and focuses on Oklahoma's art community; it produced a spin-off series, Gallery America, that debuted in January 2016).

Newscasts
OETA is one of only a handful of PBS member outlets that produces a local or regional news program. The network launched its news operations on January 3, 1977, when it premiered The Oklahoma Report, a half-hour nightly newsmagazine, consisting of three ten-minute interview programs. Due to viewer demand, by 1980, the program expanded into a conventional news program that featured both pre-recorded news stories filed by OETA's own reporting staff in Oklahoma City and Tulsa, and taped reports from news-producing commercial television stations in the Oklahoma City and Tulsa markets. (Although Oklahoma is served by four television markets that each have commercial network-affiliated stations licensed within the state, the Oklahoma News Report did not include reports from stations based in the Lawton–Wichita Falls and Ada–Sherman markets; reports from Fort Smith–Fayetteville and Amarillo stations that were filed from municipalities on the respective Oklahoma sections of either market were also not presented.) In subsequent years, the program incorporated content from the Oklahoma Department of Agriculture, Food, and Forestry; the Oklahoma Department of Career and Technology Education and eventually, OETA's Stateline and Gallery production units. The retooling of The Oklahoma Report came after OETA raised enough funding to hire a three-person anchor/reporter staff and a small production crew.

For much of its first fourteen years on the air, the program was anchored by El Reno native Tom Gilmore, who also hosted two public affairs shows on the network, Legislative Week in Review and Oklahoma Week in Review. (Prior to joining OETA, Gilmore served as a news anchor at KSWO-TV [channel 7] in Lawton and as host of the children's program Captain Tom's Popeye Theater on KOCO-TV in Oklahoma City.) Gilmore would eventually be appointed as OETA's manager of news and public affairs after Pam Henry (former anchor/reporter at KTVY and KWTV in Oklahoma City, who also served as the last poster child for March of Dimes' polio awareness campaign at age 8) stepped down from the position in 1987. Following Gilmore's retirement from broadcasting in 1990, Dick Pryor, Mary Carr Lee and Lisa Mason (the former two formerly worked as anchor/reporters at KOCO-TV; the latter served as anchor of the defunct Newstouch 25 updates aired on KOKH-TV in Oklahoma City) took over as anchors of the retitled Oklahoma News Report.

For its first 35 years on the air, ONR (as the program would become formally retitled in 2012, before reverting to the full name in October 2020) had originally aired as a nightly broadcast on Monday through Friday evenings (albeit with preemptions on Independence Day, Labor Day, Thanksgiving Day and the day after, Christmas Eve and Day, and New Year's Eve and Day). As a weeknightly program, the format of the Oklahoma News Report more closely resembled that of the evening news programs seen on the major broadcast networks. The newscast never featured a regular sports segment within each night's edition, but occasionally featured sports-related stories when warranted. The newscast also regularly featured a stock market segment featuring the day's closing numbers on the Dow Jones and Nasdaq market indexes, and stocks for Oklahoma-based businesses (such as Kerr-McGee, ConocoPhillips and Sonic Drive-In).

In July 2010, OETA altered the program's format following the legislature's decision to slash the authority's budget appropriations by $994,000 drop in the state budget for the 2010 fiscal year, coupled with $725,000 in additional cuts that were made to the agency earlier in the year. Longtime anchors George Tomek (a former anchor at KFOR-TV and KOCO-TV in Oklahoma City, who joined OETA in 2007) and Gerry Bonds (who joined OETA in 1996 after a nine-year stint as evening anchor/reporter at KOCO) were permanently suspended from the program, leaving longtime news anchor and manager, Dick Pryor (who briefly stepped back from his duties on the program in 2007, to become chief of staff for Lieutenant Governor Jari Askins, and left the program permanently in 2015 to become director of client services for Oklahoma City-based public relations firm Candor), as the sole anchor of ONR. (the program is anchored by Rich Lenz, who also serves as OETA's news director and had previously served an anchor/reporter at CBS affiliate KOTV-DT [channel 6] in Tulsa.) The program also eliminated its daily weather segment (presented for years by meteorologist Ross Dixon), relegating weather coverage during the program to situations in which it warranted being the focus of a news story; the same budget issues that led to Tomek, Bonds and Dixon's terminations also resulted in OETA suspending production of five of its news and documentary programs, OKC Metro (an interview program hosted by Bonds that debuted in 1995), Tulsa Times (a newsmagazine series focusing on issues and events concerning the Tulsa area that ran from 1995 to 2009), State of Creativity (a recurring program focusing on Oklahoma's arts community), The People's Business (a monthly financial advice and interview series) and Legislative Week (a series focusing on activity in the Oklahoma Legislature that debuted in 1979).

As a consequence of the Oklahoma State Legislature's passage of its 2011 budget referendum that cut OETA's annual budget by 9%, the network announced on June 29, 2011, that, after the July 1 broadcast, the Oklahoma News Report would transition from a traditional nightly general news program into a weekly prime time newsmagazine. (The newscast's conversion away from a weeknight newscast saw ONRs longtime 6:30 p.m. timeslot subsequently be occupied by the latter half of the PBS NewsHour as part of a shuffling of OETA's early evening news block that also resulted in the relocation of the Nightly Business Report to an earlier timeslot and the addition of BBC World News America to the member network's lineup.) On July 15, 2011, ONR returned as an hour-long Friday evening magazine series (rebroadcasting on Saturdays over OETA's main channel); by 2013, the program had reverted to a half-hour broadcast. Coinciding with the program's 40th anniversary, on October 16, 2020, the Oklahoma News Report returned to a one-hour format; in addition to debuting a new logo and graphics package as well as a set that debuted in December 2020, the re-expanded format added investigative reports and a 15-minute-long panel discussion segment featuring Oklahoma cultural leaders, journalists and investigative reporters discussing statewide issues.

Local program hosts
Oklahoma News Report
 Rich Lenz – anchor; also news director
 Robert Burch – substitute anchor

Reporters
 Susan Cadot – "InDepth" segment moderator
 Jason Doyle – general assignment reporter
 Steve Shaw – general assignment reporter
 Rory Taylor – general assignment reporter; also photographer

Oklahoma Horizon
 Rob McClendon – host
 Andy Barth – general assignment reporter

Notable former on-air staff
 David Dank – political analyst/commentator (deceased; served as member of the Oklahoma House of Representatives from 2007 to 2015)

Notes

References

External links
 

PBS member networks
State agencies of Oklahoma
Education in Oklahoma
Television stations in Oklahoma
Television channels and stations established in 1956
1956 establishments in Oklahoma